Ann Fanshawe, Lady Fanshawe (25 March 1625 – 20 January 1680) was an English memoirist and cookery author. Her recipe for ice cream is thought to be the earliest recorded in Europe.

Early life and education

Ann (or Anne) Harrison was born on 25 March 1625 in the parish of St Olave Hart Street, London. She was the eldest daughter of Sir John Harrison of Hertfordshire and Margaret Fanshawe. She had three brothers and a sister.  Her childhood was spent in London and at Balls Park, Hertford.

Her mother took great pains with her education, directing her attention more especially to domestic usefulness. Fanshawe liked not only French, needlework and music, but riding and running, and described herself with hindsight as "what we graver people call a hoyting girle."

Her mother died in July 1640, when Fanshawe was fifteen years old, but she was left capable of managing her father's household with discretion and economy. The father remarried, having a son and a daughter by his second wife.

Career
Ann's family was Royalist and they moved with the court to Oxford during the English Civil War.
In 1644, at the age of nineteen, she married at Wolvercote near Oxford, her second cousin, Richard (later Sir Richard) Fanshawe (1608–1666). He was also Royalist and was secretary of war to Prince Charles. They had 14 children, of whom four daughters and a son survived into adulthood.

The following year, 1645, she accompanied Fanshawe to Spain, where he became Secretary to the British Embassy. Returning to England, her husband exerted himself strenuously in the cause of Charles I of England. He was taken prisoner at the Battle of Worcester in 1651 and for a time closely confined. His wife, not being permitted to visit him, exposed herself to great hardships in order to alleviate his painful solitude by standing to converse with him outside his window in the middle of the night and in bad weather. On his release, they withdrew to Tankersley Park, in Yorkshire, where he occupied himself with poetry and literature, and his wife turned to writing as well. A book of cookery and medicaments was compiled by Lady Fanshawe, the earliest entries, by an amanuensis, dating from 1651. Her recipe for ice cream is thought to be the earliest recorded in Europe.

They spent the latter years of the Civil War and the Interregnum travelling, for instance to Caen, Paris, The Hague, Ireland, Madrid, and Flanders, as well as London, Yorkshire, Huntingdonshire, Hertfordshire and Bath, Somerset. Richard published translations and kept in touch with the royal family. The family joined Charles II in Flanders, Richard was appointed Latin secretary and master of requests, and knighted at Breda in 1656.

After the Restoration, Richard represented the University of Cambridge in Parliament, went to Portugal to help broker Charles II's marriage to Catherine of Braganza, and served as ambassador to Portugal (1662–63) and to Spain (1664–66). Richard died suddenly in 1666 in Madrid, after which, the widow and her family returned to England. In the first anguish of bereavement, she was exposed to such distressing poverty that she long wanted pecuniary means to deliver his remains to the tomb of his ancestors, and to maintain support of her children. Sir Richard's salary was in arrear, and no remittances could be obtained from the Ministers of the profligate King. The Queen of Spain offered Lady Fanshawe and her five children a handsome provision, on condition of their conforming to the Roman Catholic Church, but the widow withstood the temptation, even while the embalmed corpse of her husband lay daily in her sight. Means were furnished at last by the Queen Dowager of Spain, the removal to England was effected, and Sir Richard's remains were interred within the chapel of St. Mary in the church of Ware.

Later life
In widowhood, Fanshawe devoted herself to the education of her children, to acts of benevolence, and to self-improvement. In 1676, Fanshawe transcribed the manuscript Memoir of her husband (now held in the British Library) for private family circulation. It was addressed to their son Richard and began with conventional biblical and other admonitions. It is interspersed with descriptions of Richard's character as one for his son to emulate, it provides a colourful account of their adventures, and carefully observed details of clothing and customs encountered in their travels. It was also intended to vindicate the family's financial claims against the government. It ends abruptly in 1671. There is a modern edition of the Memoir.

Death and legacy
She died in January, 1680, probably at Ware, Hertfordshire, where she was buried on 20 January 1680. There is a portrait in oils of Lady Fanshawe by Cornelis Janssens van Ceulen held at the Valence House Museum in Dagenham, London, a gift from a descendant in 1963.

Style and themes
The Memoir which she wrote of herself is her best and most durable monument; a likeness is prefixed to it.

The following extract shows her character as well as her husband's:

In her book of recipes (1665), she left the first known written recipe for ice cream (which she called "icy cream").

References

Bibliography

Further reading
 Davidson Peter; "Fanshawe , Ann, Lady Fanshawe (1625–1680)", Oxford Dictionary of National Biography, Oxford University Press, 2004
 Cadman Seelig, Sharon; Autobiography and Gender in Early Modern Literature: Reading Women's Lives, 1600-1680. Cambridge: Cambridge University Press.

External links
 
 

1625 births
1680 deaths
17th-century English memoirists
17th-century English women writers
Burials in Hertfordshire
Writers from London
Wives of baronets
Women cookbook writers
People from the City of London
Women in the English Civil War
British women memoirists